Llanddeusant is a very sparsely populated community in the Black Mountain (range) of the Brecon Beacons National Park in Carmarthenshire, Wales. It is about 5 miles southeast of Llangadog.

Llanddeusant lies within the Llansadwrn & Llangadog / Myddfai & Llanddeusant ward, which had a population of 2,412 at census 2001. The boundaries were changed and most of the population was shown under the Llangadog community. The remaining population at the 2011 census was 220 only. The name, meaning "church of two saints", is supposed to originate from the fact that Teilo and Saint David are believed to have met there. The 'Old Red Lion Inn' is now a Youth hostel. The community includes the hamlet of Twynllanan.

Setting

The village lies below the prominent Black Mountain (range) escarpment and the glacial lake of Llyn y Fan Fach. The lake is the setting of a famous folk tale known as The Lady of the Lake.

Beacons way
A low level alternative of the footpath the Beacons Way runs by Llanddeusant. In the west, the route climbs to Carreg Cennen Castle and Garn Goch.  The route formerly finished at the railway station at Llangadog but now stops at the village of Bethlehem .
The community is bordered by the communities of: Quarter Bach; Llangadog; and Myddfai, all being in Carmarthenshire; and by Llywel and Ystradgynlais in Powys.

References

External links 

www.geograph.co.uk : photos of Llanddeusant and surrounding area

 
Communities in Carmarthenshire